The Mughal–Persian Wars were a series of wars fought in the 17th and 18th centuries between the Safavid and Afsharid Empires of Persia, and the Mughal Empire, over what is now Afghanistan. The Mughals consolidated their control of what is today India and Pakistan in the 16th century, and gradually came into conflict with the powerful Safavids and Afsharids, led by Abbas the Great and Nader Shah respectively. Aside from Nader Shah's invasion of the Mughal Empire, most of the conflict between the two powers were limited to battles for control over Kandahar. From a Safavid point of view, the Mughal army counted as "far less formidable" than that of their arch rivals the Ottomans.

War of 1622–23
 The Mughal–Safavid War of 1622–23 was fought over the important fortress city of Kandahar, in Afghanistan, between the Safavid empire of Persia and the Mughal empire of India. It resulted in a clear Persian victory.

Having secured crushing victories against the Ottomans, Shah Abbas desired to capture the strategic fortress on Kandahar since he had lost it in 1595. In 1605 the governor of Herat, Hosayn Khan, besieged the city but the tenacious defense of the Mughal governor, Shah Beg Khan, and the arrival in the next year of a relieving Mughal army to Kandahar forced the Safavids to retreat. With the conclusion of the Ottoman–Safavid War (1603–1618), Shah Abbas was secure enough for a war on his eastern frontier, so in 1621 he ordered an army to gather at Nishapur. After celebrating the new year at Tabas Gilaki in southern Khorasan, Abbas joined with his army and marched on Kandahar where he arrived on 20 May and immediately began the siege. Though Jahangir had information of the Persian's movements he was too slow to respond, and without reinforcements the small garrison of 3,000 men could not hold for long against the superior Persian army.

The Emperor asked his son and heir apparent Khurram who was at Mandu in the Deccan to lead the campaign, but Khurram evaded the assignment fearing to lose his political power while he was away from court. The relief force the Mughal's could assembled proved too small to raise the siege, so after a 45-day siege the city fell on 22 June followed shortly after by Zamindawar. After fortifying the city and appointing Ganj Ali Khan as governor of the city, Abbas returned to Khorasan via Ghur, subduing on the way troubling emirs in Chaghcharan and Gharjistan. The rebellion of Khurram absorbed the Mughal's attention, so in the spring of 1623 a Mughal envoy arrived at the Shah's camp with a letter from the Emperor accepting the loss of Kandahar and putting an end to the conflict.

War of 1649–53

The Mughal–Safavid War of 1649-53 was fought between the Mughal and Safavid empires in the territory of modern Afghanistan. The war began after a Persian army, while the Mughals were at war with the Janid Uzbeks, captured the fortress city of Kandahar and other strategic cities that controlled the region. The Mughals attempted unsuccessfully to regain the city from the Persians, thus the war resulted in a Persian victory.

Nadir Shah's invasion of India

Attracted by its wealth and knowing that the victim was much weaker, Emperor Nadir Shah, the Shah of Iran (1736–47) and founder of the Afsharid dynasty, invaded Northern India with a fifty-five thousand strong army, eventually attacking Delhi in March 1739 where he completely sacked and looted the city, after issuing orders for a general massacre to take place. His army had defeated the Mughal emperor Muhammad Shah at the battle at Karnal in less than three hours and had taken over control of northern India. The Mughal emperor Muhammad Shah had to beg Nader to grant him and his people mercy, after ceding the keys of the city and royal treasury to him. (Which included the legendary Peacock throne, the symbol of Iranian imperial might, and the fabulous Darya-e noor and Koh-i-Noor).

The Battle of Karnal (13 February 1739), was a decisive victory for Nader Shah, the emperor of the Afsharid dynasty during his invasion of India. The Shah's forces defeated the numerically superior army of Muhammad Shah, the Indian emperor of the Mughal dynasty, in little more than three hours thus paving the way for the Persian sack of Delhi.

References and notes

Wars involving Safavid Iran